Edmond-René Labande (1908-1992) was a French archivist and historian.

Early life
Edmond-René Labande was born in Paris on June 11, 1908. He was orphaned at the age of ten and raised by his maternal grandfather, Alfred Jeanroy. His paternal uncle, Léon-Honoré Labande, was a museum curator and archivist of the Prince's Palace of Monaco.

Labande graduated from the University of Paris in 1928. He also graduated from the École pratique des hautes études and the École Nationale des Chartes.

Career
Labande started his career as an archivist in Rome, Algiers, Florence, Toulon, and La Flèche.

Labande started teaching medieval history at the University of Poitiers in 1947. Two years later, in 1949, he was promoted to professor. He was a co-founder of the Cahiers de civilisation médiévale, an academic journal.

Labande was the first scholar to offer a skeptical interpretation of Eleanor of Aquitaine, debunking the myth of her persona and researching primary sources about her life.

Personal life
Labande married Yvonne Mailfert in 1932. Labande joined the Third Order of Saint Francis in 1942.

Death
Labande died in Poitiers on July 22, 1992.

Bibliography
Rinaldo Orsini, comte de Tagliacozzo (1390) (1939).
Étude sur Baudouin de Sebourc. Chanson de geste (Droz, 1940).
Sainte Catherine de Sienne et le duc d’Anjou (Annales de l’Université de Poitiers, 1949).
Florence, Paris, Arthaud (coll. Les beaux pays, 1950).
Rome, Paris, Arthaud (coll. Les beaux pays, 1950).
L'Italie de la Renaissance. Duecento - Trecento - Quattrocento. Évolution d'une société (Payot, 1954).
Clément V et le Poitou (1957).

References

1908 births
1992 deaths
University of Paris alumni
French archivists
French medievalists
Academic staff of the University of Poitiers
Members of the Third Order of Saint Francis
École Nationale des Chartes alumni
Corresponding Fellows of the Medieval Academy of America